Salomo Abraham Taroç (Hebrew: שלמה אברהם בן יצחק טארוש) was a 14th century Sephardic Jewish physician and money lender.

Biography 
He was born in early 1301 in Girona, Catalonia. His father, Isaac Taroç, was a wealthy landowner, a representative of Gironan Jewry and the son of Vidal Taroç. In his early years, Salomo studied medicine in Vic, later moving back to Girona, where he married Dolca Bonjuà, a member of the wealthy Bonjuà family of bailiffs and court officials. Her father Maimó ibn Mahir Bonjuà was a wealthy judge of Vic, with ancestral connections to Girona. The couple moved to Barcelona, where Salomo amassed great wealth by renting out properties and lending money to Christian aristocrats, becoming one of the wealthiest Jews in Girona. It was also around this time that Salomo became one of the leading physicians in Girona, possibly even serving as a physician for members of the Crown of Aragon. Salomo moved again to Verges, where he probably died around 1380. He had two sons, Abraham David Taroç and Isaac Baro Taroç.

See also 
Taroç family

References 

Jewish physicians
Spanish Jews
14th-century Sephardi Jews
1301 births
1380 deaths
European Sephardi Jews